Ilyinskoye is a rural locality (a village) in Mayskoye Rural Settlement, Vologodsky District, Vologda Oblast, Russia. The population was 379 as of 2002.

Geography 
The distance to Vologda is 18 km, to Maysky is 6 km. Maurino, Myagrino, Mitenskoye, Petrakovo and Skorodumka are the nearest rural localities.

References 

Rural localities in Vologodsky District